Carroll Park is a neighborhood in the city of Long Beach, California.

Curving streets lined with Craftsman Bungalows recall the horse-and-buggy era for this subdivision laid out in 1907.  Landscaped islands are a unique neighborhood amenity.

History
Carroll Park was the first planned housing tract in Long Beach. Homes were originally constructed here between 1898 and 1923. At least a dozen houses and three barns built during his brief tenure here still stand. In all, about seventy-five houses in the Park predate 1940. Several old barns survive from an earlier time.

Carroll Park was built at the turn of the century by John Carroll, and was the first planned housing tract in Long Beach, California. The Park was designated a Historic Landmark District in 1982, just shortly after the City recognized the need to preserve Long Beach’s treasured communities.*

The Park's unique circular layout gives it a seclusion that is unlike any other historic district in Long Beach. (See map, https://web.archive.org/web/20061006110320/http://www.longbeach.gov/civica/filebank/blobdload.asp?BlobID=5344]

Carroll Park is a residential neighborhood of single family and duplex homes, some modest, some quite impressive, but all well maintained. There are no businesses within the Park. The Park boasts a wide variety of historic architectural styles, old-growth trees, and narrow streets that wind around the four grassy islands that anchor the Park’s inner circle.

The streets were built for horse and buggy, so traffic is naturally deterred. Historians indicate that the Park was planned in this circular fashion with its complex maze of streets to deter the farm and ranch wagons on their way to town. The horses and wagons are gone, but the Park continues to enjoy the absence of through traffic.

Carroll Park attracts walkers from many of the neighboring Bluff Heights communities. Two churches sit adjacent to the Park. Throughout the year, residents enjoy the mild microclimate of Bluff Park.

A Carroll Park neighborhood association has existed for years, and residents join together for an annual potluck picnic or on the rare occasion that something threatens to impinge on the historic significance or peacefulness of the Park. Unlike other historic districts, home tours are not routinely offered: There doesn’t appear to have been one since July 1982, when the Park was initially designated a historic district.

Location
Carroll Park is bordered by 3rd Street to the south, Wisconsin Avenue to the east, 4th Street to the north, and Junipero Avenue to the west.

To the south and east of Carroll Park is Bluff Heights, to the north is Rose Park South, to the north and west is the 4th Street Corridor, and to the south and west is Alamitos Beach.

Movies and television
Carroll Park appears in Coyote Ugly.

References

External links

Neighborhoods in Long Beach, California
Populated places established in 1898